Anastasia Alexandrovna Dotsenko (born 14 October 1986 in Zelenodolsk) is a Russian cross-country skier. 
She competed at the FIS Nordic World Ski Championships 2011 in Oslo, and at the FIS Nordic World Ski Championships 2013 in Val di Fiemme. She competed at the 2014 Winter Olympics in Sochi, where she reached the quarter finals in the ladies' sprint, and she was part of the Russian team that placed sixth in the team sprint, along with Yuliya Ivanova.

On 1 December 2017 she was disqualified from the 2014 Winter Olympics, as a result of a positive doping test.

Cross-country skiing results
All results are sourced from the International Ski Federation (FIS).

Olympic Games

World Championships

World Cup

Season standings

Individual podiums
2 podiums – (1 , 1 )

References

External links
 
 

1986 births
Living people
People from Zelenodolsk, Russia
Cross-country skiers at the 2014 Winter Olympics
Russian female cross-country skiers
Tour de Ski skiers
Olympic cross-country skiers of Russia
Russian sportspeople in doping cases
Doping cases in cross-country skiing
Sportspeople from Tatarstan
21st-century Russian women